Robert Connell Clarke is a US American agronomist and ethnobotanist born in 1953, specialized in the study of the cannabis plant. 

He has often been credited for having taken part in many developments of the licit hemp and cannabis sectors in the United States and the Netherlands since the 1980s.

Biography 
Clarke graduated in 1977 from the University of California Santa Cruz.

In the 1980s, he took part as a breeder in the creation of the cannabis seed bank Cultivators Choice together with David P. Watson with whom he later co-funded Hortapharm B.V., a Dutch cannabis research and development business licensed to produce medicinal cannabis.

He was once manager of the International Hemp Association, a now-defunct organization based in Amsterdam.

Academic research 
In 1977, shortly after graduating, Clarke self-published his undergraduate research dissertation under the title "The botany and ecology of Cannabis." He would spend the following years continuing to research and publish on the topics of evolutionary and botanical history of the plant genus.

Books 
Some of Clarke's key publications include:
 Marijuana Botany. An Advanced Study: The Propagation and Breeding of Distinctive Cannabis (And/Or Press, 1981) 
 Hashish! (Red Eye Press, 1998) 
 Hemp Diseases and Pests: Management and Biological Control – an Advanced Treatise (CABI Pub, 2000), with John M. McPartland and David P. Watson. 
 Cannabis: Evolution and Ethnobotany (University of California Press, 2013), with Mark D. Merlin. 
Some of his publications received an important echo. According to Clarke, "Marijuana Botany played an unforeseen role in spreading plant science to the public." Clarke also published numerous peer-review articles that received less public attention.

Ethnobotanical research 
Clarke is known for having studied a number of local varieties, cultures, and agricultural practices linked to cannabis in remote regions of the world in Southeast Asia, such as Nepal, China, Vietnam, but also in other areas of Africa, Europe, the Americas, and Oceania. In 2018, a promotional documentary was released by a Canadian hemp company documented Robert Clarke's journey through Turkey exploring local traditional hemp cultures.

In relation to this field work, Clarke has participated in the development of methodological tools for cannabis research. He has also been associated with the discovery and identification of archaeological remains of cannabis in the Israeli Tel Arad site.

References 

American botanical writers
American botanists
American cannabis activists
Botanists
Botanists active in Asia
Botanists active in Central Asia
Cannabis cultivation
Cannabis research
Evolution by taxon
Evolutionary biologists
Living people
1953 births